Cristhian Venegas (born 27 May 1993) is a Chilean footballer who plays as a defender.

Career

Youth career

Venegas started his career at Primera División de Chile club O'Higgins. He progressed from the under categories club all the way to the senior team.

O'Higgins

Venegas won the Apertura 2013-14 with O'Higgins, in the 2013–14 Súper Final Apertura against Universidad Católica, being the first title for O'Higgins.

In 2014, he won the Supercopa de Chile against Deportes Iquique, in the match that O'Higgins won at the penalty shoot-out.

He participated with the club in the 2014 Copa Libertadores where they faced Deportivo Cali, Cerro Porteño and Lanús, being third and being eliminated in the group stage.

Honours

Club
O'Higgins
Primera División: Apertura 2013-14
Supercopa de Chile: 2014

Individual

O'Higgins
Medalla Santa Cruz de Triana: 2014

References

External links
 Venegas at Football Lineups
 

1993 births
Living people
Chilean footballers
O'Higgins F.C. footballers
Chilean Primera División players
Association football defenders
People from Los Ángeles, Chile